SAP BusinessObjects Lumira also known as Lumira is a business intelligence software developed and marketed by SAP BusinessObjects. The software is used to manipulate and visualize data.

History
Lumira was initially launched as SAP Visual Intelligence in 2012. The first edition of the software could only use SAP's HANA platform as a data source. The second release expanded data sources to include CSV and Excel files. In 2013, SAP rebranded the software under the Lumira name and began offering a version of the software as a cloud computing program. In 2015, the cloud version of Lumira was absorbed into SAP's Cloud For Analytics software, while the Lumira Server and Lumira Desktop software remained separate. 

In 2016, Lumira 2.x was announced. The upcoming software is said to be able to run applications from the Design Studio 1.6 data visualization software.

See also
BusinessObjects
SAP SE

References

Business intelligence software
Business software for Linux
Business software for Windows